Maurice Vaughan (1660 -  26 April 1722) was a Canon of Windsor from 1695 to 1722

Career

He was educated at Eton College and St John's College, Cambridge and graduated BA in 1681, and MA in 1684.

He was appointed:
Fellow of Trinity Hall, Cambridge 1685 - 1694
Rector of Yelling 1692 - 1722
Prebendary of Lichfield 1692 - 1722

He was appointed to the second stall in St George's Chapel, Windsor Castle in 1695, and held the stall until 1722.

Notes 

1660 births
1722 deaths
Canons of Windsor
People educated at Eton College
Alumni of St John's College, Cambridge